Piallamore is a small outer suburb of Tamworth located about 15 km South-East of the city. It is located within the Parry County Cadastral division of New South Wales in the New England region.

Piallamore was first settled on the gently sloping hills at the base of the Moonbi Range and spread out to the fertile Peel River flats.

Facilities/Services
       Anglican Church
       Tennis courts
       Bus service to Tamworth Primary and Secondary schools
       NSW Rural Fire Service brigade
       Public roads

Notes and references